Isaac Willis (born November 12, 1955) is an American vocalist and guitarist who was a regular member of Frank Zappa's studio and touring bands from 1978 until the last tour in 1988.  He did not tour with Zappa in 1981 and 1982 because he wanted to be at home for the birth of his two children, and returned to touring with Zappa for his final two tours in 1984 (which Zappa intended at the time to be his final tour) and 1988. He currently tours with the Frank Zappa tribute bands Bogus Pomp, Ossi Duri, Project/Object, Pojama People, Ugly Radio Rebellion and ZAPPATiKA. He also performed several times with the Brazilian Zappa cover band, The Central Scrutinizer Band, The Muffin Men, and with the Italian bands Ossi Duri and Elio e le Storie Tese .  Additionally, he has appeared multiple times at the annual Zappanale Festival in Bad Doberan, Germany.  He is most recognized for his involvement in Zappa records such as playing Joe in Joe's Garage, providing vocals on Tinsel Town Rebellion, You Are What You Is, and The Man from Utopia, and as the title character and narrator in Zappa's off-Broadway-styled conceptual musical Thing-Fish.

Willis also regularly does studio voice work and writes compositions for films. He also creates solo music and leads The Ike Willis Band.  He has released two solo studio albums under his own name and is working on another album.

Years with Frank Zappa
 
Willis met Zappa during a 1977 concert at his school, Washington University in St. Louis, his hometown. "Black Napkins," a track from the 1976 album Zoot Allures, was one of the first Zappa songs that made a deep impression on the singer.

The triple album Joe's Garage featured lead singer Ike Willis as the voice of the character "Joe" in a rock opera about the danger of political systems, and the suppression of freedom of speech and music - inspired in part by the Iranian Revolution that had made music illegal within its jurisdiction at the time - and about the "strange relationship Americans have with sex and sexual frankness". The album contains rock songs like "Catholic Girls" (a riposte to the controversies of "Jewish Princess"), "Lucille Has Messed My Mind Up", and the title track, as well as extended live-recorded guitar improvisations combined with a studio backup band dominated by drummer Vinnie Colaiuta (with whom Zappa had a particularly good musical rapport). On some of the tracks Zappa superimposes material recorded in different time signatures, a process he termed xenochrony. The album contains one of Zappa's signature guitar pieces, "Watermelon in Easter Hay".

Willis deeply regrets that Zappa died before he was able to include him in a band that would also have toured in 1996, the 25th anniversary of the release of Zappa's surrealistic musical pseudo-documentary 200 Motels. The band was also to have included Flo & Eddie and George Duke.

Discography

With Frank Zappa

Other artists

Ike Willis Band

See also
LaClede Town

References

External links

 Ike Willis Website
 Ike Willis Management

 
 

1955 births
Living people
African-American rock musicians
American rock guitarists
American male guitarists
People from St. Louis County, Missouri
20th-century American guitarists
African-American guitarists
20th-century American male singers
20th-century American singers
20th-century African-American male singers
21st-century African-American people